The Capt. James Moore Farmstead in Waterloo, Illinois represents the oldest American settlement in the Northwest Territory. It includes the Bellefontaine House, the kitchen of which is believed to be Moore's original log cabin. It was placed on the National Register of Historic Places on May 3, 1982.

References

Further reading
Moore, John Milton.  "Reminiscences of the Moore Family: Descended from James Moore, who Settled at Belle Fontaine, in the State of Illinois, in the Year 1782."  Evening Tribune Book and Job Printing House, 1882.

"Combined History of Randolph, Monroe and Perry Counties, Illinois: With Illustrations Descriptive of Their Scenery and Biographical Sketches of Some of Their Prominent Men and Pioneers" (Google eBook).  Higginson Book Company:  Monroe County, Ill., 1883.

External links
National Register of Historic Places

Farms on the National Register of Historic Places in Illinois
Waterloo, Illinois
Buildings and structures in Monroe County, Illinois
National Register of Historic Places in Monroe County, Illinois